The northern hooded scaly-foot (Pygopus steelescotti) is a species of legless lizard in the family Pygopodidae. The species is native to northern Australia.

Etymology
The specific name, steelescotti, is in honor of Dr. Colin Steele-Scott for his support of the South Australian Museum.

Geographic range
P. steelescotti is found in northeastern Western Australia, northern Northern Territory, and northwestern Queensland, Australia.

Habitat
The preferred natural habitat of P. steelescotti is forest.

Description
The tail is very long, 100% to 152% of SVL.

Reproduction
P. steelescotti is oviparous.

References

Further reading
Cogger HG (2014). Reptiles and Amphibians of Australia, Seventh Edition. Clayton, Victoria Australia: CSIRO Publishing. xxx + 1,033 pp. .
James BH, Donnellan SC, Hutchinson MN (2001). "Taxonomic revision of the Australian lizard Pygopus nigriceps (Squamata: Gekkonoidea)". Records of the South Australian Museum 34 (1): 37–52. (Pygopus steelescotti, new species, pp. 48–50, Figure 4B).
Wilson, Steve; Swan, Gerry (2013). A Complete Guide to Reptiles of Australia, Fourth Edition. Sydney: New Holland Publishers. 522 pp. .

Pygopus
Reptiles described in 2001
Endemic fauna of Australia
Pygopodids of Australia
Legless lizards